Diego Martín Zabala Morales (born 19 September 1991) is a Uruguayan footballer who plays as an attacking midfielder for Nacional in the Uruguayan Primera División.

Career
Zabala started his career playing for Racing Club de Montevideo in 2011. He helped his team to a second-place finish in the 2014 Apertura tournament, although the team finished last in the immediately following 2015 Clausura.

The Uruguayan midfielder joined Vélez Sarsfield on loan for the 2016 Argentine Primera División. He debuted in a 0–1 defeat to Arsenal de Sarandí for the sixth fixture. Zabala scored his first two goals for the team in the tenth fixture, helping Vélez comeback in the game to defeat Rosario Central 3–2.

Career statistics

References

External links
Profile at Vélez Sarsfield's official website 
Diego Zabala at Soccerway

1991 births
Living people
People from Montevideo
Uruguayan footballers
Uruguayan expatriate footballers
Association football midfielders
Racing Club de Montevideo players
Club Atlético Vélez Sarsfield footballers
Unión de Santa Fe footballers
Rosario Central footballers
Club Nacional de Football players
Uruguayan Primera División players
Argentine Primera División players
Uruguayan expatriate sportspeople in Argentina
Expatriate footballers in Argentina